Amanda Palmer Performs the Popular Hits of Radiohead on Her Magical Ukulele is an EP by musician Amanda Palmer. It is composed entirely of cover versions of songs by the band Radiohead, performed by Palmer on the ukulele. It was released on July 20, 2010.

Reception 

Paste Magazine listed "Fake Plastic Trees", from this album, as one of their 20 best covers of the year. Palmer's cover of "Idioteque" was National Public Radio's Song of the Day for January 11, 2011.

Track listing

Personnel
Amanda Palmer – vocals, piano, ukulele
Lyndon Chester – violin on "Exit Music (For a Film)"
Zoë Keating – cello on "Exit Music (For a Film)"

References

External links
Amanda Palmer Performs the Popular Hits of Radiohead on Her Magical Ukulele on Palmer's 

2010 albums
Amanda Palmer EPs
Radiohead tribute albums